These are the results of 2019 BWF World Senior Championships' 50+ events.

Men's singles

Seeds 
  Wu Chang-jun (gold medalist)
  Karoon Kasayapanan (third round)
  Narong Vanichitsarakul (quarterfinals)
  Joakim Nordgren (bronze medalist)
  Kent Wæde Hansen (withdrew)
  Magnus Gustafsson (fourth round)
  Jean Chistensen (third round)
  Ronald Glaschke (fourth round)
  Hubert Mueller (fourth round)
  Nihal Amarasena (second round)
  Mark Peard (third round)
  Juan Rafols (third round)
  Rajeev Sharma (quarterfinals)
  Jacek Hankiewicz (silver medalist)
  Sven Landwehr (second round)
  Jukka Antila (third round)

Finals

Top half

Section 1

Section 2

Section 3

Section 4

Bottom half

Section 5

Section 6

Section 7

Section 8

Women's singles

Seeds 
  Tanja Eberl (bronze medalist)
  Dorota Grzejdak (bronze medalist)
  Caroline Hale (gold medalist)
  Betty Blair (quarterfinals)
  Poonam Tatwawadi (quarterfinals)
  Berit Thyness (quarterfinals)
  Aileen Travers (quarterfinals)
  Bettina Villars (second round)

Finals

Top half

Section 1

Section 2

Bottom half

Section 3

Section 4

Men's doubles

Seeds 
  Bobby Ertanto /  Ting Wei Ping (second round)
  Graham Henderson / Mark Topping (second round)
  Jon Austin / Rajeev Bagga (quarterfinals)
  Jean Chistensen / Henrik Lykke (bronze medalists)
  Magnus Nytell / Erik Söderberg (second round)
  Wattana Ampunsuwan / Narong Vanichitsarakul (gold medalists)
  Milan Duvsund / Joakim Nordgren (quarterfinals)
  Venkataraju Akula / B. V. S. K. Lingeswara Rao (quarterfinals)

Finals

Top half

Section 1

Section 2

Bottom half

Section 3

Section 4

Women's doubles

Seeds 
  Betty Blair / Debora Miller (second round)
  Elizabeth Austin / Caroline Hale (silver medalists)
  Lene Struwe Andersen / Hanne Bertelsen (quarterfinals)
  Jill Smith / Aileen Travers (third round)
  Kumiko Kushiyama / Ritsuko Sato (gold medalists)
  Tanja Karlsson /  Berit Thyness (bronze medalists)
  Lise Lotte Bilgrav / Gitte Kruse (bronze medalists)
  Lali Joseph / Joseph Tessy (second round)

Finals

Top half

Section 1

Section 2

Bottom half

Section 3

Section 4

Mixed doubles

Seeds 
  Rajeev Bagga / Elizabeth Austin (gold medalists)
  Mark Topping / Dorothy McCullough (quarterfinals)
  Puryanto Tan / Rosiana Tendean (quarterfinals)
  Erik Söderberg / Tanja Karlsson (second round)
  Alan McMillan / Aileen Travers (quarterfinals)
  Morten Christensen / Hanne Bertelsen (bronze medalists)
  Jon Austin / Carolin Hale (second round)
  Henrik Lykke / Lise Lotte Bilgrav (second round)

Finals

Top half

Section 1

Section 2

Bottom half

Section 3

Section 4

References 
Men's singles
Women's singles
Men's doubles
Women's doubles
Mixed doubles

2019 BWF World Senior Championships